Dave Rogers (27 March 1942 – 6 October 2000) was an Australian rules footballer who played with Carlton and North Melbourne in the Victorian Football League (VFL).

Notes

External links 

Dave Rogers's profile at Blueseum

1942 births
Carlton Football Club players
North Melbourne Football Club players
Australian rules footballers from Victoria (Australia)
2000 deaths